Chrysallida is a speciose genus of minute sea snails, pyramidellid gastropod mollusks or micromollusks in the family Pyramidellidae within the tribe Chrysallidini.

Taxonomy 
The genus Folinella had two preoccupied names - Amoura De Folin, 1873 not J.E. Gray 1847, and Funicularia Monterosato, 1884 not Forbes, 1845.

The genus Chrysallida Carpenter, 1856 has been used as a catchall, particularly in the European literature following a lead by Winckworth (1932), for most pyramidellids having both axial and spiral sculpture but having otherwise little in common with the Californian type species C. communis (C. B. Adams, 1852). A statement that this is incorrect was voiced by van Aartsen, Gittenberger & Goud (2000: 21) who nevertheless still used Chrysallida as the genus to include many Eastern Atlantic species, distributed into several subgenera. Micali, Nofroni & Perna (2012) restored usage of Parthenina Bucquoy, Dautzenberg & Dollfus, 1883 for several species formerly placed in Chrysallida. This move was continued by Høisæter (2014), Peñas, Rolán & Swinnen (2014) and Giannuzzi-Savelli et al. (2014) who are here followed, but there are still many species remaining unduly under Chrysallida. For these, we have refrained from making new combinations not backed by (or implicit from) a published source. Nevertheless, all the species that were already "accepted" under a subgenus, now raised to full genus, have been marked as "accepted" under that full genus.

Distribution
Species within the genus Chrysallida are commonly distributed in all oceans from the tropics to the polar regions, the Arctic and the Antarctic. It is mainly known from coastal areas, and is uncommon in deep elevations such as trenches in the sea.

The members of Chrysallida are ectoparasites on serpulid polychaetes.

Species
There are multiple species within the genus Chrysallida, these include the following in alphabetical order:

 Chrysallida affinis (Laseron, 1959)
 Chrysallida africana van Aartsen & Corgan, 1996
 Chrysallida angusta Carpenter, 1864
 Chrysallida annobonensis Peñas & Rolán, 2002
 Chrysallida asiatica Corgan, 1970
 Chrysallida australis Thiele, 1930
 Chrysallida bellula A. Adams, 1860
 Chrysallida bjoernssoni Warén, 1991
 Chrysallida boucheti Peñas & Rolán, 1999
 Chrysallida caelatura (Laseron, 1951)
 Chrysallida canariensis Nordsieck & Talavera, 1979
 Chrysallida cancellata (d'Orbigny, 1841)
 † Chrysallida cantaurana Landau & LaFollette, 2015
 Chrysallida carpinei van Aartsen, Gittenberger & Goud, 2000
 Chrysallida castleraghensis Saurin, 1959
 Chrysallida chetelati Saurin, 1962
 Chrysallida communis (C.B. Adams, 1852)
 Chrysallida conifera Pimenta, 2012
 Chrysallida connexa (Dautzenberg, 1912)
 Chrysallida costellata A. Adams, 1861
 Chrysallida culaoniana Saurin, 1959
 † Chrysallida curvicostata (Grant-Mackie & Chapman-Smith, 1971) 
 Chrysallida declivata (Laseron, 1959)
 Chrysallida decorata (Philippi, 1849)
 Chrysallida dux (Dall & Bartsch, 1906)
 † Chrysallida eocenica (Laws, 1941) 
 Chrysallida epitonoides van Aartsen, Gittenberger E. & Goud, 2000
 Chrysallida erucella A. Adams, 1863
 Chrysallida eugeniae Peñas & Rolán, 1998
 Chrysallida fenestrata (Jeffreys, 1848)
 Chrysallida foveata Robba, Di Geronimo, Chaimanee, Negri & Sanfilippo, 2004
 Chrysallida foveolata (A. Adams, 1860)
 Chrysallida galbula A. Adams, 1863
 Chrysallida gemmulosa (C. B. Adams, 1850)
 Chrysallida genouillyi Saurin, 1962
 Chrysallida gitzelsi van Aartsen, Gittenberger & Goud, 2000
 Chrysallida gubbiolii Peñas & Rolán, 1998
 Chrysallida gunnamatta (Laseron, 1951)
 Chrysallida herosae Peñas & Rolán, 1998
 Chrysallida hoeisaeteri Warén, 1991
 Chrysallida hoenselaari van Aartsen, Gittenberger & Goud, 2000
 Chrysallida honnorati Saurin, 1959
 Chrysallida horii van Aartsen, gittenberger & Goud, 2000
 Chrysallida impercepta Schander, 1994
 Chrysallida indistincta (Henn & Brazier, 1894)
 Chrysallida innocua Corgan, 1970
 Chrysallida insularis (Oliver, 1915)
 Chrysallida intorta Hoffman & Freiwald, 2017
 Chrysallida intumescens Schander, 1994
 Chrysallida kesteveni (Hedley, 1907)
 Chrysallida kymatodes (Watson, 1886)
 Chrysallida leoni Fernández-Garcés, Peñas & Rolán, 2011
 Chrysallida littoralis (A. Adams, 1861)
 Chrysallida lucida (Laseron, 1950)
 Chrysallida maoria (Powell, 1940)
 Chrysallida mayii (Tate, 1898)
 Chrysallida mcmillanae van Aartsen, Gittenberger & Goud, 2000
 Chrysallida medialuna Faber, 2008
 Chrysallida megembryon Saurin, 1958
 Chrysallida menkhorsti van Aartsen, Gittenberger E. & Goud, 2000
 Chrysallida metula A. Adams, 1860
 Chrysallida minna A. Adams, 1860
 Chrysallida minutissima (Dautzenberg & H. Fischer, 1906)
 Chrysallida mirationis (Laseron, 1959)
 Chrysallida multicostata (Laseron, 1959) 
 Chrysallida multituberculata (Castellanos, 1982)
 Chrysallida munda A. Adams, 1860
 Chrysallida nana (A. Adams, 1861)
 Chrysallida navisa (Dall & Bartsch, 1907)
 Chrysallida nioba (Dall & Bartsch, 1911)
 Chrysallida ovalis Thiele, 1930
 Chrysallida pelorcei Peñas & Rolán, 1998
 Chrysallida phanthietina Saurin, 1958
 Chrysallida projectura (Laseron, 1959)
 Chrysallida pura (Saurin, 1962)
 Chrysallida pusio A. Adams, 1861
 Chrysallida pygmaea A. Adams, 1861
 Chrysallida pyrgulina Peñas & Rolán, 1998
 Chrysallida ryalli Peñas & Rolán, 2002
 Chrysallida saurini Robba, Di Geronimo, Chaimanee, Negri & Sanfilippo, 2004
 Chrysallida seamounti Peñas & Rolán, 1999
 Chrysallida semiplicata A. Adams, 1860
 Chrysallida semipunctata Nomura, 1937
 Chrysallida sibana (Yokoyama, 1927)
 Chrysallida simulans (Chaster, 1898) (taxon inquirendum)
 Chrysallida sixtoi Peñas & Rolán, 1998
 Chrysallida spiralis (Laseron, 1959)
 Chrysallida stefanisi (Jeffreys, 1869)
 Chrysallida stupa Hori & Fukuda, 1999
 Chrysallida sublustris (Friele, 1886)
 Chrysallida subtantilla Golikov in Golikov & Scarlato, 1967
 Chrysallida terebra A. Adams, 1861
 Chrysallida thetisae Espinosa & Ortea, 2011
 Chrysallida trachis (Dall & Bartsch, 1909)
 Chrysallida tribulationis (Hedley, 1909)
 Chrysallida trifuniculata (Saurin, 1962)
 Chrysallida turbonillaeformis van Aartsen, Gittenberger & Goud, 2000
 Chrysallida typica (Laseron, 1959)
 Chrysallida vanbruggeni van Aartsen & Corgan, 1996
 Chrysallida verdensis Peñas & Rolán, 1998
 Chrysallida vignali (Lamy, 1910)
 Chrysallida vincentina (Tryon, 1886)
 Chrysallida vincula (Laseron, 1951)
 Chrysallida zea (Hedley, 1902)
 † Chrysallida zecarinata Laws, 1948

Synonyms
The following species were brought into synonymy
 
 Chrysallida alleryi (Kobelt, 1903): synonym of Parthenina monterosatii (Clessin, 1900)
 Chrysallida angulosa (Monterosato, 1889): synonym of Parthenina angulosa (Monterosato, 1889)
 Chrysallida anselmoi Peñas & Rolán, 1998: synonym of Parthenina anselmoi (Peñas & Rolán, 1998)
 Chrysallida antimaiae Schander, 1994: synonym of Parthenina obesa (Dautzenberg, 1912)
 Chrysallida approximans (Dautzenberg, 1912): synonym of Kongsrudia approximans (Dautzenberg, 1912)
 Chrysallida brattstroemi Warén, 1991: synonym of Parthenina brattstroemi (Warén, 1991)
 Chrysallida brevicula (Jeffreys, 1883): synonym of Turbonilla amoena (Monterosato, 1878)
 Chrysallida brusinai (Cossmann, 1921): synonym of Spiralinella incerta (Milaschewitsch, 1916)
 Chrysallida buijsei De Jong & Coomans, 1988: synonym of Fargoa bushiana (Bartsch, 1909)
 Chrysallida casta A. Adams, 1861: synonym of Pyrgulina casta (A. Adams, 1861)
 Chrysallida clathrata (Jeffreys, 1848): synonym of  Parthenina clathrata (Jeffreys, 1848)
 Chrysallida columna: synonym of Pyrgulina columna (Laseron, 1959)
 Chrysallida colungiana F. Nordsieck, 1972: synonym of Parthenina dollfusi (Kobelt, 1903)
 Chrysallida consobrina A. Adams, 1861: synonym of Pyrgulina consobrina (A. Adams, 1861)
 Chrysallida convexa (Carpenter, 1857): synonym of Besla convexa (Carpenter, 1857)
 Chrysallida dantarti Peñas & Rolán, 2008: synonym of  Parthenina dantarti (Peñas & Rolán, 2008)
 Chrysallida decussata (Montagu, 1803): synonym of  Parthenina decussata (Montagu, 1803)
 Chrysallida dekkeri van Aartsen, Gittenberger E. & Goud, 2000: synonym of Parthenina dekkeri (van Aartsen, Gittenberger & Goud, 2000)
 Chrysallida dimidiata Schander, 1994: synonym of Pyrgulina dimidiata (Schander, 1994)
 Chrysallida doliolum (Philippi, 1844): synonym of Odostomella doliolum (Philippi, 1844)
 Chrysallida dollfusi (Kobelt, 1903): synonym of Parthenina dollfusi (Kobelt, 1903)
 Chrysallida elegans (de Folin, 1870): synonym of Liamorpha elegans (de Folin, 1870)
 Chrysallida emaciata (Brusina, 1866): synonym of Parthenina emaciata (Brusina, 1866)
 Chrysallida ersei Schander, 1994: synonym of Kongsrudia ersei (Schander, 1994)
 Chrysallida excavata (Philippi, 1836): synonym of Folinella excavata (Phillippi, 1836)
 Chrysallida eximia (Jeffreys, 1849): synonym of Parthenina eximia (Jeffreys, 1849)
 Chrysallida faberi van Aartsen, Gittenberger & Goud, 2000: synonym of Parthenina faberi (van Aartsen, Gittenberger & Goud, 2000)
 Chrysallida falcifera (Watson, 1881): synonym of Tragula falcifera (Watson, 1881) 
 Chrysallida farolita F. Nordsieck, 1972: synonym of Parthenina interstincta (Adams J., 1797)
 Chrysallida feldi van Aartsen, Gittenberger & Goud, 2000: synonym of Parthenina feldi (van Aartsen, Gittenberger & Goud, 2000)
 Chrysallida fenestrata (Jeffreys, 1848): synonym of Tragula fenestrata (Jeffreys, 1848)
 Chrysallida fischeri (Hornung & Mermod, 1925): synonym of Pyrgulina fischeri Hornung & Mermod, 1925
 Chrysallida flexuosa (Monterosato, 1874): synonym of Parthenina flexuosa (Monterosato, 1874)
 Chrysallida gabmulderi van Aartsen, Gittenberger & Goud, 2000: synonym of Parthenina gabmulderi (van Aartsen, Gittenberger & Goud, 2000)
 Chrysallida ghisottii (van Aartsen, 1984): synonym of Folinella ghisottii van Aartsen, 1984
 Chrysallida gruveli (Dautzenberg, 1910): synonym of Kongsrudia gruveli (Dautzenberg, 1910)
 Chrysallida humilis (Preston, 1905): synonym of  Quirella humilis (Preston, 1905)
 Chrysallida incerta (Milaschewitsch, 1916): synonym of Spiralinella incerta (Milaschewich, 1916)
 Chrysallida inconspicua A. Adams, 1861: synonym of Chrysallida innocua Corgan, 1970
 Chrysallida indistincta (Montagu, 1808): synonym of  Parthenina indistincta (Montagu, 1808)
 Chrysallida intermixta (Monterosato, 1884): synonym of Parthenina monozona (Brusina, 1869)
 Chrysallida interspatiosa van der Linden & Eikenboom, 1992: synonym of Parthenina flexuosa (Monterosato, 1874)
 Chrysallida interstincta (Adams J., 1797): synonym of Parthenina interstincta (J. Adams, 1797)
 Chrysallida jadisi (Olsson & McGinty, 1958): synonym of Boonea jadisi (Olsson & McGinty, 1958)
 Chrysallida jeffreysiana (Monterosato, 1884): synonym of Trabecula jeffreysiana Monterosato, 1884
 Chrysallida jordii Peñas & Rolán, 1998: synonym of Folinella moolenbeeki van Aartsen, Gittenberger E. & Goud, 1998
 Chrysallida josae van Aartsen, Gittenberger & Goud, 2000: synonym of Parthenina josae (van Aartsen, Gittenberger & Goud, 2000)
 Chrysallida juliae (de Folin, 1872): synonym of  Parthenina juliae (de Folin, 1872)
 Chrysallida jullieni (Dautzenberg, 1912): synonym of Pyrgulina jullieni Dautzenberg, 1912
 Chrysallida kempermani van Aartsen, Gittenberger E. & Goud, 2000: synonym of Pyrgulina kempermani (van Aartsen, Gittenberger & Goud, 2000)
 Chrysallida kronenbergi van Aartsen, Gittenberger & Goud, 2000: synonym of Trabecula kronenbergi (van Aartsen, Gittenberger & Goud, 2000)
 Chrysallida lacourti F. Nordsieck, 1972: synonym of Spiralinella spiralis (Dillwyn, 1817)
 Chrysallida limitum (Brusina in de Folin & Périer, 1876): synonym of Parthenina limitum (Brusina in de Folin & Périer, 1876)
 Chrysallida maiae (Hornung & Mermod, 1924): synonym of Pyrgulina maiae Hornung & Mermod, 1924
 Chrysallida manonegra Peñas & Rolán, 1998: synonym of Chrysallida minutissima (Dautzenberg & H. Fischer, 1906)
 Chrysallida mariella (A. Adams, 1860): synonym of Egilina mariella (A. Adams, 1860)
 Chrysallida mariellaeformis: synonym of Babella mariellaeformis (Nomura, 1938)
 Chrysallida marthinae Nofroni & Schander, 1994: synonym of Spiralinella marthinae (Nofroni & Schander, 1994)
 Chrysallida mauritanica Peñas & Rolán, 1998: synonym of Parthenina mauritanica (Peñas & Rolán, 1998)
 Chrysallida micronana Ozturk & van Aartsen, 2006: synonym of Pyrgulina nana Hornung & Mermod, 1924
 Chrysallida monozona (Brusina, 1869): synonym of Parthenina monozona (Brusina, 1869)
 Chrysallida monterosatii (Clessin, 1900): synonym of Parthenina monterosatii (Clessin, 1900)
 Chrysallida moolenbeeki Amati, 1987: synonym of Parthenina moolenbeeki (Amati, 1987)
 Chrysallida muinaiensis (Saurin, 1962): synonym of Spiralinella muinaiensis Saurin, 1962
 Chrysallida multicostata (Jeffreys, 1884): synonym of Parthenina multicostata (Jeffreys, 1884)
 Chrysallida mumia A. Adams, 1861: synonym of Turbonilla mumia (A. Adams, 1861)
 Chrysallida mutata (Dautzenberg, 1912): synonym of Kongsrudia mutata (Dautzenberg, 1912)
 Chrysallida nanodea (Monterosato, 1878): synonym of Parthenina juliae (de Folin, 1872)
 Chrysallida nivosa (Montagu, 1803): synonym of Jordaniella nivosa (Montagu, 1803)
 Chrysallida obesa (Dautzenberg, 1912): synonym of Pyrgulina obesa Dautzenberg, 1912
 Chrysallida obtusa (Brown, 1827): synonym of Chrysallida interstincta (Adams J., 1797), synonym of Parthenina interstincta (J. Adams, 1797)
 Chrysallida oodes (Watson, 1886): synonym of Pyrgulina oodes (Watson, 1886)
 Chrysallida opaca Hedley, 1906: synonym of Odostomella opaca (Hedley, 1906)
 Chrysallida palazzii Micali, 1984: synonym of  Parthenina palazzii (Micali, 1984)
 Chrysallida parasigmoidea Schander, 1994: synonym of Parthenina parasigmoidea (Schander, 1994)
 Chrysallida pellucida (Dillwyn, 1817): synonym of Spiralinella spiralis (Montagu, 1803)
 Chrysallida penchynati: synonym of Parthenina penchynati (Bucquoy, 1883)
 Chrysallida perscalata (Hedley, 1909): synonym of Linopyrga perscalata (Hedley, 1909)
 Chrysallida pinguis Peñas & Rolán, 1998: synonym of Pyrgulina pinguis (Peñas & Rolán, 1998)
 Chrysallida pirinthella (Melvill, 1910): synonym of Pyrgulina pirinthella Melvill, 1910
 Chrysallida plicata A. Adams, 1860: synonym of Pyrgulina plicata (A. Adams, 1860)
 Chrysallida pontica Grossu, 1986: synonym of Parthenina pontica (Grossu, 1986)
 Chrysallida pseudalveata Nomura, 1936: synonym of Pyrgulina pseudalveata (Nomura, 1936)
 Chrysallida pulchella A. Adams, 1860: synonym of Pyrgulina pulchella (A. Adams, 1860)
 Chrysallida pulchra Gaglini, 1992: synonym of Miralda elegans (de Folin, 1870): synonym of Liamorpha elegans (de Folin, 1870)
 Chrysallida punctigera (A. Adams, 1860): synonym of Linopyrga punctigera (A. Adams, 1860)
 Chrysallida pupula (A. Adams, 1861): synonym of Pyrgulina pupula (A. Adams, 1861)
 Chrysallida pyttelilla Schander, 1994: synonym of Parthenina pyttelilla (Schander, 1994)
 Chrysallida rinaldii Micali & Nofroni, 2004: synonym of Parthenina rinaldii (Micali & Nofroni, 2004)
 Chrysallida rufolineata A. Adams, 1863: synonym of Odostomella rufolineata (A. Adams, 1863)
 Chrysallida sarsi: synonym of Parthenina sarsi (Nordsieck, 1972)
 Chrysallida sergei Nofroni & Schander, 1994: synonym of Parthenina sergei (Nofroni & Schander, 1994)
 Chrysallida sigma: synonym of Kunopia sigma (Hedley, 1907)
 Chrysallida sigmoidea (Monterosato, 1880): synonym of Strioturbonilla sigmoidea (Monterosato, 1880)
 Chrysallida spiralis (Montagu, 1803): synonym of Spiralinella spiralis (Dillwyn, 1817)
 Chrysallida suturalis (Philippi, 1844): synonym of Parthenina suturalis (Philippi, 1844)
 Chrysallida tantilla (A. Adams, 1863): synonym of Linopyrga tantilla (A. Adams, 1863)
 Chrysallida terebellum (Philippi, 1844): synonym of Parthenina terebellum (Philippi, 1844)
 Chrysallida terryi (Olsson & McGinty, 1958): synonym of Ivara terryi (Olsson & McGinty, 1958)
 Chrysallida toroensis (Olsson & McGinty, 1958): synonym of Mumiola gradatula (Mörch, 1876)
 Chrysallida tricincta (Jeffreys, 1856): synonym of Odostomella doliolum (Philippi, 1844)
 Chrysallida truncatula (Jeffreys, 1850): synonym of Jordaniella truncatula (Jeffreys, 1850)
 Chrysallida ultralaeta Nomura, 1936: synonym of Parthenina ultralaeta (Nomura, 1936)
 Chrysallida undata (Watson, 1897): synonym of Trabecula jeffreysiana Monterosato, 1884
 Chrysallida vanderlindeni van Aartsen, Gittenberger & Goud, 2000: synonym of Pyrgulina vanderlindeni (van Aartsen, Gittenberger & Goud, 2000)
 Chrysallida willeminae van Aartsen, Gittenberger E. & Goud, 2000: synonym of Parthenina willeminae (van Aartsen, Gittenberger & Goud, 2000)

Ecology 
Little is known about the ecology of the members of this genus. As is true of most members of the Pyramidellidae sensu lato, they are most likely ectoparasites.

References 

 Carpenter P.P. (1856) Description of new species and varieties of Calyptraeidae, Trochidae, and Pyramidellidae, principally in the collection of Hugh Cuming, Esq. Proceedings of the Zoological Society of London, 24: 166-171
 Adams A. (1863). On the species of Pyramidellinae found in Japan. Journal of the Proceedings of the Linnean Society of London, 7: 1-6
 Schaufuss L.W. (ed). 1869. Molluscorum systema et catalogus. System una Aufzählung sämmtlicher Conchylien der Sammlung von Fr. Paetel. 4 pp unpaginated, pp. i-xiv and 1-119. Dresden
 de Folin L. 1870. D'une méthode de classification pour les coquilles de la famille des Chemnitzidae. Annales de la Société Linnéenne du Département du Maine et Loire 12: 191-202
 Monterosato T. A. (di) (1884). Nomenclatura generica e specifica di alcune conchiglie mediterranee. Palermo, Virzi pp. 152 [month of publication unknown, but later than February (the paper in Naturalista Siciliano, cited p. 57)
 Dall W.H. & Bartsch P. 1909. A Monograph of West American Pyramidellid Mollusks. Bulletin, United States National Museum, 68: i-xii, 1-258, 30 pl.
 Iredale T. (1915). Notes on the names of some British marine Mollusca. Proceedings of the Malacological Society of London, 11(6): 329-342
 Iredale T. 1917. Molluscan name-changes, generic and specific. Proceedings of the Malacological Society of London, 12: 322-330
 Corgan J.X. 1973. The names Partulida Schaufuss, 1869 and Spiralinella Chaster, 1901 (Gastropoda, Pyramidellacea). Journal of Conchology, 28: 9-10.
 Gofas, S.; Le Renard, J.; Bouchet, P. (2001). Mollusca, in: Costello, M.J. et al. (Ed.) (2001). European register of marine species: a check-list of the marine species in Europe and a bibliography of guides to their identification. Collection Patrimoines Naturels, 50: pp. 180–213
 Spencer, H.; Marshall. B. (2009). All Mollusca except Opisthobranchia. In: Gordon, D. (Ed.) (2009). New Zealand Inventory of Biodiversity. Volume One: Kingdom Animalia. 584 pp

Further reading

External links 

 Chrysallida nioba- Niobe odostome
 Chrysallida toroensis
 Occurrence of the genus Chrysallida
 Folinella sp.
 To ITIS

 
Pyramidellidae